Discovery! is the debut album by jazz saxophonist Charles Lloyd released on the Columbia label featuring performances by Lloyd with Don Friedman, Eddie Khan, Roy Haynes, Richard Davis and J.C. Moses. The Allmusic review by Scott Yanow awarded the album 4 stars and states "Lloyd's Coltrane-inspired sound was already in place, and his flute playing was becoming distinctive. The music is essentially melodic but advanced hard bop, a strong start to an important career". The piece "Ol' Five Spot" is a homage to the legendary New York jazz club of the same name.
The album was also released with the title Bizarre in the UK, at the time.

Track listing
All compositions by Charles Lloyd except as indicated.

 "Forest Flower" - 7:54
 "How Can I Tell You" - 5:16
 "Little Peace" - 6:32
 "Bizarre" - 4:20
 "Days of Wine and Roses" (Henry Mancini, Johnny Mercer) - 5:53
 "Sweet Georgia Bright" - 5:45
 "Love Song to a Baby" - 5:56
 "Ol' Five Spot" - 6:34

Personnel
Tracks 1, 4-5, 8
Charles Lloyd - tenor saxophone, flute
Don Friedman - piano
Eddie Khan - bass
Roy Haynes - drums

Tracks 2-3, 6-7
Charles Lloyd - tenor saxophone, flute
Don Friedman - piano
Richard Davis - bass
J. C. Moses - drums

Production
Henry Parker - photography

References

1964 debut albums
Columbia Records albums
Charles Lloyd (jazz musician) albums
Albums produced by George Avakian